Scopula convergens is a moth of the family Geometridae. It was described by Warren in 1904. It is endemic to Colombia.

References

Endemic fauna of Colombia
Moths described in 1904
convergens
Taxa named by William Warren (entomologist)
Moths of South America